Acie is a given name, and may refer to:

 Acie Earl (born 1970), American former professional basketball player
 Acie Griggs (1923–2007), American baseball player
 Acie Law (born 1985), professional basketball player
 Acie Lumumba (born 1988), Zimbabwean politician